Iyengra (İenŋe) is a rural locality (a selo), the only inhabited locality, and the administrative center of Iyengrinsky Rural Okrug of Neryungrinsky District in the Sakha Republic, Russia, located on the Iyengra River,  from Neryungri, the administrative center of the district. Its population as of the 2010 Census was 1,104, down from 1,216 recorded during the 2002 Census.

History
It was founded in 1926 and named after the river on which it is located. The river's name derives from an Evenk word meaning horn, referring to the river's branches reputedly resembling the antlers of a deer when seen from the local hills.

Demographics
The population is mainly ethnic Evenks, with 856 of the 1,104 inhabitants reporting as Evenks during the 2010 Census.

Economy and transportation
The local economy is mainly based around reindeer herding, fishing, hunting, and fur farming.

The Amur–Yakutsk Mainline railway passes nearby, with a station in Zolotinka.

References

Notes

Sources
Official website of the Sakha Republic. Registry of the Administrative-Territorial Divisions of the Sakha Republic. Neryungrinsky District. 

Rural localities in the Sakha Republic